St. Mark's Episcopal Church is a parish of the Episcopal Church in Cocoa, Brevard County, Florida, in the Episcopal Diocese of Central Florida. It is noted for its historic church building located at 4 Church Street, built circa 1886. A parochial school, St. Mark's Episcopal Academy, was begun by the church in 1956.

References

External links
St. Mark's Episcopal Church and Academy (official website)

Churches completed in 1886
19th-century Episcopal church buildings
Churches in Brevard County, Florida
Cocoa, Florida
Episcopal church buildings in Florida
1878 establishments in Florida
Christian organizations established in 1878